Javad Alizadeh ( Javād Alīzādeh ; professional name: Javad; born 9 January 1953) is an Iranian professional cartoonist best known for his caricatures of politicians, comic actors, footballers, and for his scientific/philosophical column (including cartoons, caricatures and satire) titled 4D Humor, which has won awards from Italy, China and Japan. An active artist since 1970, his works have been published in international publications. He is the founder of the leading monthly cartoon magazine Humor & Caricature and is its founding and current publisher and editor-in-chief.

Early life 

Alizadeh was born on 9 January 1953 in Ardebil, northwestern Iran, and graduated BA in English translation. Influenced by his university degree, he considers writing and drawing cartoons as a tool that can translate sufferings, hardships and the mysteries of life into humorous language.

In 1990 he founded his monthly cartoon magazine Humor & Caricature and since then he has been the editor and publisher of this independent and private publication. This humorous magazine publishes both pictorial and written humor about various subjects such as politics, sports, cinema, music and philosophy. According to the official website of the magazine, the purpose of the publication is "to promote peace, laughter, tolerance, moderation and multidimensional and multilateral insight in Iranian society".

Alizadeh has also attended numerous cartoon conferences in Japan, Malta, Turkey, Bulgaria, Finland, and has served on the jury of the Skopje 86, Anglet( France ) 91, Dubai 2002, Izmir 2008 cartoon festivals and Tehran Cartoon Biennial in 1993, 1995, 1997 and 2005. He has experimented with different styles and genres of humor such as editorial, gags, portrait caricatures and black caricatures, black humor, comic strips, sport humor, surrealistic and philosophical humor, and his works have been published in many leading foreign presses and publications in the 1980s and 1990s by C & W syndicate, including Who's Who in Satire and Humor, Nebelspalter, Chicago tribune, Courrier International, Graphis annual, Osten, Mondial.

A former staff writer and editor of the Witty World cartoon magazine, Alizadeh is a member of the international Cartoonists & Writers Syndicate. He also holds membership of the Good Humor Party, a humorous party in Poland.

Mad Commentator 
Alizadeh created a humorous mascot called Mad Commentator who rose to fame after correctly "predicting" the result of the opening match between Argentina and Cameroon at the 1990 FIFA World Cup.

4D Humor 
Influenced by Albert Einstein and Isaac Newton, he created a scientific/philosophical cartoon on the Theory of Relativity titled 4D Humor. He has also published a column (including cartoons, caricatures and satire) in his monthly magazine of the same title.

In 2005 the website of the World Year of Physics carried a link to his cartoons about relativism on its "play physics page", showing his scientific cartoons.

In October 2008, his scientific cartoon on twin paradox in special relativity was shown and studied in the reading class and conference held by CERN Courier.com (The International Journal of High-Energy Physics site) in Trieste, Italy.

Awards 
Alizadeh has won some 30 prizes in international cartoon festivals including:
First Caricature Prize in Anglet Cartoon Festival, France (1990)
Silver Date prize in International Festival of the Humor of Bordighera, Italy (1996)
First Cartoon Prize in Ankara 7-77 Cartoon for the children  Festival, Turkey (2007)
First cartoon prize in Istanbul Aydin dogan cartoon festival, Turkey (2012)
Honorable mentions at the United Nations/Ranan Lurie Political Cartoon Awards (2016)
First Caricature Prize in Gallarate Contest, Italy (2019)

Bibliography

Gallery

See also 

 Kioumars Saberi Foumani

References

External links 

 Official Website 
 Alizadeh's weblog 
 Tanz o Caricature's Page 
 4D Humor 
 Profile at the Iran Cartoon
Billy Ireland Cartoon Library & Museum Art Database

Iranian satirists
Iranian humorists
People from Ardabil
1953 births
Iranian journalists
Living people
Iranian painters
Iranian bloggers
Iranian comics artists
Iranian cartoonists
Iranian caricaturists